The following outline is provided as an overview of and introduction to Antigua and Barbuda:

Antigua and Barbuda – twin-island nation lying between the Caribbean Sea and the Atlantic Ocean. It consists of two major inhabited islands, Antigua and Barbuda, and a number of smaller islands (including Great Bird, Green, Guinea, Long, Maiden and York Islands and further south, the island of Redonda). Its governance, language, and culture have all been strongly influenced by the British Empire, of which the country was formerly a part.

General reference

 Pronunciation:  and 
 Common English country name: Antigua and Barbuda
 Official English country name: Antigua and Barbuda
 Common endonym(s):  
 Official endonym(s):  
 Adjectival(s): Antiguan, Barbudan
 Demonym(s):
 ISO country codes: AG, ATG, 028
 ISO region codes: See ISO 3166-2:AG
 Internet country code top-level domain: .ag

Geography of Antigua and Barbuda 

Geography of Antigua and Barbuda
 Antigua and Barbuda are...
 islands
 a country
 an island country
 a nation state
 a Commonwealth realm
 Location:
 Northern Hemisphere and Western Hemisphere
 North America (off the East Coast of the United States, southeast of Puerto Rico)
 Atlantic Ocean
 Caribbean
 Antilles
 Lesser Antilles (island chain)
 Leeward Islands
 Time zone:  Eastern Caribbean Time (UTC-04)
 Extreme points of Antigua and Barbuda
 High:  Boggy Peak 
 Low:  Caribbean Sea 0 m
 Land boundaries:  none
 Coastline:  153 km
 Population of Antigua and Barbuda: 84,522+(2008) - 198th most populous country
 Area of Antigua and Barbuda:  - 198th largest country
 Atlas of Antigua and Barbuda

Environment of Antigua and Barbuda 

Environment of Antigua and Barbuda
 Climate of Antigua and Barbuda
 Environmental issues in Antigua and Barbuda
 Renewable energy in Antigua and Barbuda
 Geology of Antigua and Barbuda
 Protected areas of Antigua and Barbuda
 Biosphere reserves in Antigua and Barbuda
 National parks of Antigua and Barbuda
 Wildlife of Antigua and Barbuda
 Fauna of Antigua and Barbuda
 Birds of Antigua and Barbuda
 Mammals of Antigua and Barbuda

Natural geographic features of Antigua and Barbuda 
 Beaches
 Fjords of Antigua and Barbuda
 Glaciers of Antigua and Barbuda
 Islands of Antigua and Barbuda
 Lakes of Antigua and Barbuda
 Mountains of Antigua and Barbuda
 Volcanoes in Antigua and Barbuda
 Rivers of Antigua and Barbuda
 Waterfalls of Antigua and Barbuda
 Valleys of Antigua and Barbuda
 World Heritage Sites in Antigua and Barbuda: None

Regions of Antigua and Barbuda 

Regions of Antigua and Barbuda

Ecoregions of Antigua and Barbuda 

List of ecoregions in Antigua and Barbuda

Administrative divisions of Antigua and Barbuda
None.

Demography of Antigua and Barbuda 

Demographics of Antigua and Barbuda

Government and politics of Antigua and Barbuda 

Politics of Antigua and Barbuda
 Form of government: federal parliamentary representative democratic monarchy
 Capital of Antigua and Barbuda: St. John's
 Elections in Antigua and Barbuda
 Political parties in Antigua and Barbuda
 Taxation in Antigua and Barbuda
Barbuda Land Acts

Branches of government

Government of Antigua and Barbuda

Executive branch of the government of Antigua and Barbuda 
 Head of state: King of Antigua and Barbuda, Charles III
 The Monarch's representative: Governor-General of Antigua and Barbuda
 Head of government: Prime Minister of Antigua and Barbuda
 Cabinet of Antigua and Barbuda

Legislative branch of the government of Antigua and Barbuda 

 Parliament of Antigua and Barbuda (bicameral)
 Upper house: Senate of Antigua and Barbuda
 Lower house: House of Representatives of Antigua and Barbuda

Judicial branch of the government of Antigua and Barbuda 

Court system of Antigua and Barbuda
 Antigua and Barbuda is a member of the Caribbean Court of Justice - but the court's date of inauguration to be the Supreme Court of Appeal has been delayed
 Judicial Committee of the Privy Council
 Eastern Caribbean Supreme Court - based in Saint Lucia
 Court of Summary Jurisdiction of Antigua and Barbuda - one judge of the Supreme Court is a resident of the islands and presides over this court

Foreign relations of Antigua and Barbuda 

Foreign relations of Antigua and Barbuda
 Diplomatic missions in Antigua and Barbuda
 Diplomatic missions of Antigua and Barbuda

International organization membership 
The government of Antigua and Barbuda is a member of:

African, Caribbean, and Pacific Group of States (ACP)
Agency for the Prohibition of Nuclear Weapons in Latin America and the Caribbean (OPANAL)
Caribbean Community and Common Market (Caricom)
Caribbean Development Bank (CDB)
Commonwealth of Nations
Food and Agriculture Organization (FAO)
Group of 77 (G77)
International Bank for Reconstruction and Development (IBRD)
International Civil Aviation Organization (ICAO)
International Criminal Court (ICCt)
International Criminal Police Organization (Interpol)
International Development Association (IDA)
International Federation of Red Cross and Red Crescent Societies (IFRCS)
International Finance Corporation (IFC)
International Fund for Agricultural Development (IFAD)
International Labour Organization (ILO)
International Maritime Organization (IMO)
International Monetary Fund (IMF)
International Olympic Committee (IOC)

International Organization for Standardization (ISO) (subscriber)
International Red Cross and Red Crescent Movement (ICRM)
International Telecommunication Union (ITU)
International Trade Union Confederation (ITUC)
Multilateral Investment Guarantee Agency (MIGA)
Nonaligned Movement (NAM)
Organisation for the Prohibition of Chemical Weapons (OPCW)
Organization of American States (OAS)
Organization of Eastern Caribbean States (OECS)
United Nations (UN)
United Nations Conference on Trade and Development (UNCTAD)
United Nations Educational, Scientific, and Cultural Organization (UNESCO)
Universal Postal Union (UPU)
World Confederation of Labour (WCL)
World Federation of Trade Unions (WFTU)
World Health Organization (WHO)
World Intellectual Property Organization (WIPO)
World Meteorological Organization (WMO)
World Trade Organization (WTO)

Law and order in Antigua and Barbuda 

Law of Antigua and Barbuda
 Constitution of Antigua and Barbuda
 Crime in Antigua and Barbuda
 Human rights in Antigua and Barbuda
 LGBT rights in Antigua and Barbuda
 Freedom of religion in Antigua and Barbuda
 Law enforcement in Antigua and Barbuda

Military of Antigua and Barbuda 

Military of Antigua and Barbuda
 Command
 Commander-in-chief:
 Ministry of Defence of Antigua and Barbuda
 Forces
 Army of Antigua and Barbuda
 Navy of Antigua and Barbuda
 Air Force of Antigua and Barbuda
 Special forces of Antigua and Barbuda
 Military history of Antigua and Barbuda
 Military ranks of Antigua and Barbuda

Local government in Antigua and Barbuda 

Local government in Antigua and Barbuda

History of Antigua and Barbuda 

History of Antigua and Barbuda
Timeline of the history of Antigua and Barbuda
Current events of Antigua and Barbuda
 Military history of Antigua and Barbuda

Culture of Antigua and Barbuda 

Culture of Antigua and Barbuda
 Architecture of Antigua and Barbuda
 Cuisine of Antigua and Barbuda
 Festivals in Antigua and Barbuda
 Languages of Antigua and Barbuda
 Media in Antigua and Barbuda
 National symbols of Antigua and Barbuda
 Coat of arms of Antigua and Barbuda
 Flag of Antigua and Barbuda
 National anthem of Antigua and Barbuda
 People of Antigua and Barbuda
 Public holidays in Antigua and Barbuda
 Records of Antigua and Barbuda
 Religion in Antigua and Barbuda
 Christianity in Antigua and Barbuda
 Hinduism in Antigua and Barbuda
 Islam in Antigua and Barbuda
 Judaism in Antigua and Barbuda
 Sikhism in Antigua and Barbuda
 World Heritage Sites in Antigua and Barbuda: None

Art in Antigua and Barbuda 
 Art in Antigua and Barbuda
 Cinema of Antigua and Barbuda
 Literature of Antigua and Barbuda
 Music of Antigua and Barbuda
 Television in Antigua and Barbuda
 Theatre in Antigua and Barbuda

Sports in Antigua and Barbuda 

Sports in Antigua and Barbuda
 Football in Antigua and Barbuda
 Antigua and Barbuda at the Olympics

Economy and infrastructure of Antigua and Barbuda 

Economy of Antigua and Barbuda
 Economic rank, by nominal GDP (2007): 164th (one hundred and sixty fourth)
 Communications in Antigua and Barbuda
 Internet in Antigua and Barbuda
 Companies of Antigua and Barbuda
Currency of Antigua & Barbuda: Dollar
ISO 4217: XCD
 Antigua and Barbuda Stock Exchange
 Health care in Antigua and Barbuda
 Transport in Antigua and Barbuda
 Airports in Antigua and Barbuda
 Rail transport in Antigua and Barbuda
 Tourism in Antigua and Barbuda
 Visa policy of Antigua and Barbuda

Education in Antigua and Barbuda 

Education in Antigua and Barbuda
 List of schools in Antigua and Barbuda
 List of universities in Antigua and Barbuda

See also

Antigua and Barbuda

Index of Antigua and Barbuda-related articles
List of Antigua and Barbuda-related topics
List of international rankings
Member state of the Commonwealth of Nations
Member state of the United Nations
Outline of geography
Outline of North America
Outline of the Caribbean

References

External links

 Government
 The Official Website of the Government of Antigua and Barbuda
 Antigua & Barbuda, its Department of Tourism website
 Antigua and Barbuda, United States Library of Congress Portals on the World
 Governments on the WWW: Antigua and Barbuda

 Country Data
Antigua and Barbuda. The World Factbook. Central Intelligence Agency.
World Bank's country data profile for Antigua and Barbuda
Worldwide Governance Indicators
 World Intellectual Property Handbook: Antigua and Barbuda

 Other
 The High Commission of Antigua and Barbuda. Tourism, business, history and culture, politics - an up-to-date website.
 Antigua Carnival - with photo galleries.
 American University of Antigua - a hospital integrated medical school in Caribbean.
 Health Sciences library - Library of American University of Antigua
 Antigua car rental
 Recipes to many Antiguan dishes
 Video of Antigua and Barbuda

Antigua and Barbuda
Antigua and Barbuda
Antigua and Barbuda